Tony Hoar (10 February 1932 – 5 October 2019) was a British racing cyclist. He represented England in the road race at the 1954 British Empire and Commonwealth Games in Vancouver, Canada.

He gained selection for the Tour de France, where he finished in last place in the 1955 Tour de France.

References

External links

1932 births
2019 deaths
British male cyclists
People from Emsworth
Cyclists at the 1954 British Empire and Commonwealth Games
Commonwealth Games competitors for England